Allan Evans may refer to:

 Allan Evans (Australian sportsman) (1897–1955), Western Australian cricketer and footballer
 Allan Evans (footballer) (born 1956), Scotland international footballer and Aston Villa player
 Allan Evans (politician) (1917–1992), politician in Newfoundland, Canada
 Allan Evans (record producer) (1956–2020), American musicologist and record producer

See also
 Alan Evans (1949–1999), Welsh darts player
 Alan Evans (academic), Canadian neurologist and neuroscientist
 Alan Evans, drummer for Soulive
 Alun Evans (disambiguation)